Microphysogobio pseudoelongatus is a species of cyprinid fish found in Guangxi, China.

References

Cyprinid fish of Asia
Freshwater fish of China
Fish described in 2001
Microphysogobio